Regent's Park College Boat Club is the boat club of Regent's Park College, Oxford, a permanent private hall of the University of Oxford. It is based in New College Boat House which it shares with New College Boat Club.

The club was established shortly after Regent's Park became a permanent private hall of the university in 1957 and currently owns two boats, one named "Regent's Shark", in which the men's team row, and a more-lightweight women's eight named 'Bond Girls.' The club competes in a number of inter-collegiate races in both the male and the female categories.

History

The boat club has competed in most Torpids and Eights competitions throughout its history and occasionally puts out a boat for the Christ Church Regatta. In 2014, the women's novice boat that entered the Christ Church Regatta proceeded to win the overall competition – among the biggest achievements for any Regent's Park sports team in history. Both the men's and women's boat have won blades on a number of occasions and in 1979 the boat club undertook a charity row from Oxford back to the college's origins in Regent's Park, London, which was filmed by the BBC for a special documentary.

In 2005, a joint Regent's Park-LMH women's crew took part in the Oxford-Cambridge Channel Challenge, setting a new record for a women's crew rowing across the English Channel.

Between 2005 and 2010, the Men's VIII established a record of thirty-four consecutive starts in a bumps race without being bumped once itself. The Men's VIII has currently gone sixteen days of racing, or four years, without being bumped in the Summer Eights competition (as well as nine days in Torpids), the third-best record of crews currently on the water.

Double blades (blades in Torpids and Eights in the same year) have been achieved three times in boat club history – by the Men's crews of 1979 and 2006, and the Women's crews of 2015 and 2016.

After a sustained period of success, both the Men's and Women's boats are in historically high positions: the Men are at their highest position since 1982 in Torpids and their highest ever position in Summer Eights, while the Women's winning of Trophy Blades in the 2019 Summer Eights propelled them to their highest position since 2000.

Governance

The club is governed by a committee of students, who are all elected in Trinity Term. The Executive Committee consists of a President, Treasurer, and the Men's and Women's Captains, along with the Senior Member.

Most of the club's funding comes from the JCR and from its sponsors.

Traditions

Members of the club who have rowed in at least one university race (and, usually, who have won trophy blades in that race) are entitled to wear the boat club blazer, especially at the college's annual Final Fling ball. Club members who have competed in at least one race (but not won trophy blades) are entitled to wear the boat club tie. 

On the final day of each regatta, the Men's and Women's crews all down a small Smirnoff ice or non-alcoholic alternative.

Results

Summer Eights Blades (since 1980)

 Men: 1986, 1993, 1994, 1995, 2000, 2006
 Women: 1994, 2007, 2015, 2016, 2019

Torpids Blades (since 1980)

 Men: 1991, 2006, 2012
 Women: 2013, 2015, 2016

References

Rowing clubs of the University of Oxford
Regent's Park College, Oxford
1969 establishments in England
Sports clubs established in 1969
Rowing clubs in Oxfordshire
Rowing clubs of the River Thames